Richmond County Technical Career Magnet School (RCTCM) is a  magnet school for the arts and technical careers located in the South Augusta area of Augusta, Georgia, United States. It was formed in 2012 at the former Joseph R. Lamar School in Downtown Augusta, Georgia. In January 2013, Richmond County Technical Career Magnet School moved to the current building with Ms. Melissa Clark as Principal. It draws students in grades 6 through 12 from throughout Richmond County.

The school's mascot is a White Tiger.

References

Magnet schools in Richmond County, Georgia